Guerreiro is a Galician and Portuguese word for "warrior". It can be found as a surname in Portuguese-speaking countries.

Notable people with the surname include:

 Ana Maria Guerreiro Dias (born 1974), Portuguese long-distance and marathon runner
 André Guerreiro Rocha (born 1984), Brazilian footballer
 Bruno Miguel Guerreiro Costa (born 1986), Portuguese footballer (goalkeeper)
 David Pedrosa Guerreiro (born 1993) Portuguese footballer (midfielder) better known as Peixinho
 Diogo Filipe Guerreiro Viana (born 1990), Portuguese footballer (winger)
 Fabrício Guerreiro (born 1990), Brazilian mixed martial artist
 Félix Guerreiro (born 1950), Portuguese footballer (forward)
 Jonathan Guerreiro (born 1991), Russian-Australian ice dancer
 Jorge Manuel Guerreiro Soares (born 1971), Portuguese footballer (centre back)
 Katia Guerreiro (born 1976), Portuguese singer
 Leandro Guerreiro (born 1978), Brazilian footballer (defensive midfielder)
 Márcio Guerreiro (born 1981), Brazilian footballer (midfielder)
 Pedro Guerreiro de Jesus Correia (born 1987), Portuguese footballer (defender)
 Pedro Guerreiro (born 1966), Portuguese politician
 Ramiro Saraiva Guerreiro (1918–2011), Brazilian politician and diplomat
 Ricardo Augustus Guerreiro Baptista Leite (born 1980), Portuguese-Canadian politician
 Raphaël Guerreiro (born 1993), Portuguese footballer
 Roger Guerreiro (born 1982), Brazilian-Polish footballer (midfielder)
 Rui Manuel Guerreiro Nobre Esteves (born 1967), Portuguese footballer (midfielder)
 Toninho Guerreiro (1942–1990), Brazilian footballer (forward)

See also
 Guerrero (disambiguation), Spanish equivalent
 O Dragão da Maldade Contra o Santo Guerreiro, a 1969 Brazilian film

Galician-language surnames
Portuguese-language surnames